Gordiichthys combibus is an eel in the family Ophichthidae (worm/snake eels). It was described by John E. McCosker and Robert J. Lavenberg in 2001. It is a marine, tropical eel which is known from Colombia, in the eastern central Pacific Ocean.

The species epithet "combibo" means "to drink with a companion" in Latin, and refers to the sibling nature of G. combibus to G. randalli. The IUCN redlist currently lists G. combibus as Data Deficient, as it is known from only a few specimens collected in Colombia.

References

Ophichthidae
Fish described in 2001
Taxa named by Robert J. Lavenberg